1964 the Tribute (originally called 1964 as The Beatles) is a Beatles' tribute band that was formed in 1984. 

The group plans to continue performing. Asked about their future, Tom Work, who portrayed George Harrison until 2022, said, "The answer to that is the answer Gary gave his dad. His dad asked him, 'How long are you going to do this?' And Gary Grimes (who played Paul McCartney until his retirement in 2009 due to brain cancer which he eventually died of in 2010) said, 'Until they stop coming.' We are not anywhere close to the age the Beatles were. I'm sure many people will comment, 'They're starting to look a little old to be doing this,' but people are still coming. Just being a musician keeps you young at heart."

Updating the original Beatles
1964 the Tribute strive for authenticity in their portrayal of the Beatles, but not everything they do is the same. Two areas that differ are sound quality and set length. Mark Benson, who portrays John Lennon in the band, says in the original Beatles live performances in the 1960s, the fans were lucky to hear the music. "You have to credit the Beatles with revolutionizing the sound-reinforcement industry," says Benson. "Back then they had these little speakers that you couldn't hear anything out of. The way concerts were amplified had to be changed." Benson says fans who saw the original shows notice the difference. "People will come up to us and say, 'I saw the Beatles in '64 and the only difference is I can hear you,'" Benson says.

Another difference is the set length. The Beatles did two 30-minute sets in their early shows and never did encores, while 1964 the Tribute performs two 45-minute sets. "We tried the half-hour show initially, but it didn't go over well," says Benson.

Members
The members of the group decided which member would portray which Beatle based on the instrument he played. "I was a guitarist, so the natural thing was the John or the George character," says Tom Work, who portrayed George Harrison.  "The way I got into it was, the fellow playing John Lennon [Benson] joined a band that was a local Beatles tribute act.  This was around 1981.  After about a year, he got his buddy [Grimes] to join and play Paul, and I was friends with him.  About a year later, he got me to join and play George." Over the years, the lineup has included:

 Mark Benson (1984-Present) as John Lennon
 Gary Grimes (1984-2009; died 2010), Todd Rainey (2009-2010), Ricky Vacca (2010-2011), Graham Alexander (2011-2013), Mac Ruffing (2013-Present) as Paul McCartney
 Tom Work (1984-1986, 1989-1993, 2006-2022), Robert Miller (1986-1989), Tom Teeley (1993-1994), Jimmy Pou (1994-2006), John Auker (2022-Present) as George Harrison.
 Greg George (1984-1987, 1989-2006), Terry Manfredi (1987-1989, 2006-2010), Bobby Potter (2010-2023), Joseph Bologna (2023-Present) as Ringo Starr 

The current lineup is Mark Benson, Mac Ruffing, John Auker and Joseph Bologna.

Gary Grimes died after a long battle with brain cancer in December 2010 at age 60.  His death was hard on members and fans.  A memorial service was broadcast online. Mark Benson performed "In My Life" at the service.

Mission
The band's mission is to accurately re-create the 1964 Beatles invasion of America. Members play a set of all early Beatles music, with some middle Beatles thrown in. Sometimes the group's costumes reflect the Beatles' early period, and sometimes members wear replicas of the Shea Stadium concert apparel from 1965. The "concept is performing a show that gives you an idea of what it was like to see the Beatles when they were touring," says Benson. "It's definitely a music gig, but there's an acting element to it," says Work. "None of us is really an actor per se. I probably come closest because I've done some plays, just in community theater. But there's some acting. You need to adopt the body language, the speaking voice. Those two things, I guess, for this kind of a role are two aspects that resemble acting. Everything else is more musicianship and vocal impersonation — singing, I mean." The group separates its life onstage from offstage.  "We didn't want to be them, just wanted to portray them," says Work. "No one really considered wearing those boots around all the time or the tight pants or having hair that looked like that. We were musicians before, professional, full-time musicians. We didn't start doing Beatles until we were 30." 
http://thediscography.org/discoDbDetail.php?req=84

Discography

PBS Soundtrack CD
 I Saw Her Standing There
 I Want to Hold Your Hand
 From Me to You
 Love Me Do
 Please Please Me
 Do You Want to Know a Secret?
 All My Loving
 This Boy
 And I Love Her
 Act Naturally
 Eight Days a Week
 A Hard Day's Night
 I Should Have Known Better
 If I Fell
 Can't Buy Me Love
 Nowhere Man
 Twist and Shout
 Roll Over Beethoven
 I Feel Fine
 Paperback Writer
 In My Life
 If I Needed Someone
 We Can Work It Out
 Yellow Submarine
 Yesterday
 Help!
 Day Tripper
 She Loves You

"All You Need Is Live!"

Disc 1
 I Saw Her Standing There
 I Want To Hold Your Hand
 Love Me Do
 Please Please Me
 Do You Want to Know a Secret?
 All My Loving
 This Boy
 Till There Was You
 Eight Days a Week
 A Hard Day's Night
 I Should Have Known Better
 Nowhere Man
 Can't Buy Me Love

Disc 2
 Twist and Shout
 Roll Over Beethoven
 I Feel Fine
 Michelle
 And Your Bird Can Sing
 Taxman
 I'm a Loser
 I Don't Want to Spoil the Party
 Yellow Submarine
 Yesterday
 Help!
 Day Tripper
 She Loves You
 Dizzy Miss Lizzy
 Long Tall Sally

Nine Hours in November
 It Won't Be Long
 There's a Place
 I'll Follow the Sun
 If I Fell
 Boys
 Slow Down
 Kansas City
 Bad Boy
 Don't Bother Me
 And I Love Her
 Any Time at All
 You Can't Do That
 I'm Down
 Rock and Roll Music

30/50 Celebration
 I Want To Hold Your Hand
 I Saw Her Standing There
 Love Me Do
 Thank You Girl
 Please Please Me
 I'll Get You
 I'm Happy Just To Dance With You
 All My Loving
 Boys
 And I Love Her
 A Hard Days Night
 If I Fell
 Money
 She Loves You

Starhand Visions
Original material by Gary Grimes. Other members are on the album throughout it.
 They're Here...
 The Arrival Theme
 The Illusion
 From the Light of Change
 Hold On
 Hold On to Love
 Daydream Lover
 Marla Star
 Take Good Care of Her Heart
 Would You Say No?
 Tell Her I'm Home
 You Are My Heart
 Because of You
 I Can't Live Without Your Love
 Feel the Fire

References

External links

Musical groups established in 1984
The Beatles tribute bands
1984 establishments in the United States

http://thediscography.org/discoDbDetail.php?req=84